K. Berchem Sport is a Belgian association football club based in the district of Berchem in the municipality of Antwerp and currently playing in the Belgian Second Amateur Division.  It has formerly played in the first division.

The club was founded in 1906 and became a member of the FA two years later.  It received the matricule n°28 in 1926.  Five years later, it added the prefix Royal to its name, then changed this prefix to its Dutch counterpart Koninklijk in 1967.

Current squad
Updated 10 May 2020.

Coaching staff
Updated 3 April 2018
 Manager:  Kevin Van Haesendonck
 Assistant: Danny van Leuven
 Goalkeeper coach:  Bob Peeters

Other staff
 Sporting director: Marc De Mulder
 Team scout: Patrick Illegems
 Doctor: Peter Verspeelt

Honours
Belgian Pro League:
Runners-up (3): 1948–49, 1949–50, 1950–51
Belgian Second Division:
Winners (5): 1933–34, 1942–43, 1961–62, 1971–72, 1985–86
Belgian Second Division Final Round:
Winners (1): 1977–78
Belgian Third Division:
Winners (1): 2002–03
Belgian Fourth Division:
Winners (2): 2001–02, 2011–2012
Belgian Provincial league Antwerp:
Winners (4): 1909–10, 1910–11, 1912–13, 1913–14
Belgian Provincial league Antwerp Final Round:
Winners (1): 2000–01
Belgian Cup:
Semi-finalists (2): 1953–54, 1970–71

References

 Official website

 
Sports clubs established in 1906
Football clubs in Belgium
Football clubs in Antwerp
1906 establishments in Belgium
Association football clubs established in 1908
Belgian Pro League clubs